is a former professional Japanese baseball player.

External links

1973 births
Living people
Baseball people from Nagano Prefecture
People from Matsumoto, Nagano
Japanese baseball players
Nippon Professional Baseball outfielders
Nippon Ham Fighters players
Hokkaido Nippon-Ham Fighters players
Chunichi Dragons players
Japanese baseball coaches
Nippon Professional Baseball coaches